Gilles Deguire was a city councillor from Montreal, Quebec, Canada, who served as the borough mayor of Montreal North from 2009 to 2016. He was a member of the Union Montreal municipal political party.

Deguire previously served as a political attaché to Line Beauchamp of the Quebec Liberal Party. Prior to his life in politics, he was a police officer with the Montreal Police Service for 30 years. A former resident of Montreal North, Deguire now resides in nearby Rivière-des-Prairies.

He resigned as borough mayor on January 7, 2016, after being the subject of a police investigation.

Electoral record

References

External links
Gilles Deguire (Union Montreal)
Montréal-Nord Borough Council 

Montreal city councillors
Living people
Mayors of places in Quebec
People from Montréal-Nord
Service de police de la Ville de Montréal
Year of birth missing (living people)